Saint Maxentia of Beauvais was a 5th-century Irish virgin and hermit who was beheaded when she refused to marry. Her feast day is 20 November.

Life

Saint Maxentia of Beauvais was born in Ireland or Scotland, but fled to France to avoid being married to a pagan chieftain. She lived beside the Oise River near Senlis in the Diocese of Beauvais. The pagan chieftain tracked her down, and killed her at Pont-Sainte-Maxence when she refused to marry him.

Monks of Ramsgate account

The monks of St Augustine's Abbey, Ramsgate, wrote in their Book of Saints (1921),

Butler's account

The hagiographer Alban Butler ( 1710–1773) wrote in his Lives of the Fathers, Martyrs, and Other Principal Saints, under November 20,

Horstmann's account

Carl Horstmann reproduced a life of the saint from MS. Stowe 949, written about 1615.

Notes

Sources

 
 
 

Female saints of medieval Ireland
Female saints of medieval France
Medieval Irish saints on the Continent
5th-century deaths